The Square may refer to:

Places 
Cathedral Square, Christchurch, locally known simply as the Square
The Square, Bournemouth, a public square
The Square, Tallaght, a shopping centre in Dublin
The Square, Harlow, a now closed small music venue in England
The Square, Palmerston North, in central Palmerston North, New Zealand
The Square, West Palm Beach, a lifestyle center development in West Palm Beach, Florida
Harvard Square, Cambridge, Massachusetts, locally known as The Square
The Square (restaurant) (1991–2020), a London restaurant

Films 
The Square (1957 film), a British short film directed by Michael Winner
The Square (1994 film), a Chinese documentary
The Square, a 2007 Belorussian documentary, released on DVD as Kalinovski Square
The Square (2008 film), an Australian film
The Square (2013 film), an Egyptian/American documentary film
The Square (2017 film), a Swedish film that won the Palme d'Or at Cannes

Other uses 
T-Square (band), formerly known as The Square
The Square (group), an English grime crew formed in 2012

See also 
Square
Town square
 Square (disambiguation)
 Town square (disambiguation)
 Public Square (disambiguation)
 Market Square (disambiguation)